Karim Ahmed Khawaja is a Pakistani politician who has been a member of Senate of Pakistan, since March 2012.

Political career
He was elected to the Senate of Pakistan as a candidate of Pakistan Peoples Party in 2012 Pakistani Senate election.

References

Living people
Pakistani senators (14th Parliament)
Pakistan People's Party politicians
Year of birth missing (living people)